New Guntur railway station (station code:NGNT), is located at Nehru Nagar area of the city of Guntur in the Indian state of Andhra Pradesh. It is under the administration of Guntur railway division of South Central Railway zone.

Classification 

It is classified as an E–category station and is administered under Guntur railway division of South Central Railway zone. It is located on Krishna Canal–Guntur section and also categorised as an Adarsh station of the division.

Heritage crane 
The station houses a 35T steam crane of Guntakal railway division as a Heritage Rolling Stock.

Notable trains
The following are some of the notable Superfast Express, Express trains halting at the station.

See also 
 List of railway stations in India

References 

Transport in Guntur
Railway stations in Guntur railway division
Railway stations in Guntur district
Buildings and structures in Guntur